As per Yoga and Tantra philosophies in Hinduism, there exist psychic Chakra's in human body. There are believed to be seven major Chakras, which are arranged vertically along the axial channel (sushumna nadi). They begin from Muladhara to Sahasrara. Each of these Chakras are presided over by six Yoginis. Lakini is the Yogini  or Devi who presides over Manipura Chakra. She is referred to as the Benefactress of All.

Manipura Chakra 

Manipura or solar plexus/navel Chakra is symbolized by a downward pointing triangle with ten petals, along with the color yellow. The seed syllable is Ram, and the presiding deity is Braddha Rudra, with Lakini as the Shakti or power behind this Chakra. Corresponding deity for material element of this Chakra is Agni.

Manipura is related to the metabolic and digestive systems. Manipura is believed to correspond to Islets of Langerhans, which are groups of cells in the pancreas, as well as the outer adrenal glands and the adrenal cortex. These play a valuable role in digestion, the conversion of food matter into energy for the body. The colour that corresponds to Manipura is yellow. Key issues governed by Manipura are issues of personal power, fear, anxiety, opinion-formation, introversion, and transition from simple or base emotions to complex. Physically, Manipura governs digestion, mentally it governs personal power, emotionally it governs expansiveness, and spiritually, all matters of growth.

Description

From the book Serpent Power by Arthur Avalon, Devi Lakini is described as,

She is four-armed, of radiant body, is dark [shyaama] of complexion, clothed in yellow raiment and decked with various ornaments, and exalted with the drinking of ambrosia [i.e. She drinks the nectar dripping down from the Sahasrara and is exalted by the Divine Energy that infuses Her]. In one of her four hands she holds the thunderbolt or Vajra. In her second hand, she holds the arrow that is shot from the bow of Kama, the Lord of Sex, in the second chakra. Her third hand holds fire. With the fourth hand Lakini Shakti forms the mudra (hand gesture) of granting boons and dispelling fear.

On a red lotus in the pericarp of this Lotus is the Shakti Lakini. She is blue, has three faces with three eyes in each, is four-armed, and with Her hands holds the vajra and the Shakti weapon, and makes the signs of dispelling fear and granting boons. She has fierce projecting teeth, and is fond of eating rice and dhal, cooked and mixed with meat and blood.

From the Sat Chakra Nirupana, Devi Lakini is described as,

Here abides Lakini, the benefactress of all. She is four-armed, of radiant body, is dark [shyaama] of complexion, clothed in yellow raiment and decked with various ornaments, and exalted with the drinking of ambrosia [i.e. She drinks the nectar dripping down from the Sahasraara, and is exalted by the Divine Energy that infuses Her]. By meditating on this Navel Lotus [naabhi-padma], the power to destroy and create the world is acquired. Vaanii [i.e. Saraswati] with all the wealth of knowledge ever abides in the lotus of the meditator's face.

In a description about Manipura Chakara, Devi Lakini is the wife of Lord Rudra and

The seed mantra is the syllable 'ram'. Within the bindu or dot above this mantra resides the deity Rudra, who is red or white, with three eyes, of ancient aspect with a silver beard, and smeared with white ashes. He makes the gestures of granting boons and dispelling fear. He is either seated upon a tiger skin, or upon a bull. His Shakti is the goddess Lakini. She has a black or dark-blue vermilion color; three faces, each with three eyes; is four-armed; holds a thunderbolt, the arrow shot from the bow of Kama, fire and makes the gesture of granting boons and dispelling fear. She is seated upon a red lotus.

The name Lakini also appears in Lalita Sahasranama, name 503 as Lakinyambha swaroopini (She who is famous in the name of “Lakini”), meaning Tripura Sundari appears as Lakini in Manipura Chakra.

Association with other Yoginis  

There are seven psychic Chakras of human body begin from Muladhara to Sahasrara Chakra. Each of these Chakras are presided over by yoginis. 
In addition to that, Kundalini is the source power in Muladhara Chakra. These yoginis are,

References

External links
 Description of Manipura Chakra from Kheper.net
 Manipura - The Power Chakra by Anodea Judith

Chakras